Carterica soror is a species of beetle in the family Cerambycidae. It was described by Belon in 1896. It is known from Bolivia.

References

Colobotheini
Beetles described in 1896